Los Cabos International Airport   is the sixth-busiest airport in Mexico and one of the Top 25 in Latin America, located at San José del Cabo in Los Cabos Municipality, Baja California Sur state, Mexico.

The airport serves San José del Cabo, Cabo San Lucas, and the Los Cabos area.

History
From September 2011 until January 2012, the airport temporarily gained nonstop service to Asia with flights to Shanghai, China.

The airport handled 5,549,600 passengers in 2021 and 7,019,200 in 2022, 63% of them from international destinations. It has become the most important airport in the state of Baja California Sur. Because of a dramatic increase in the number of holiday resorts and due to the region's fast population growth, the infrastructure of the airport is now insufficient compared to the increasing demand, causing a lack of available positions for aircraft during peak-hours, as in many other airports in Mexico.

On September 15, 2014, Los Cabos International Airport was badly damaged by Hurricane Odile. Planes were knocked against structures due to the winds from Odile. Many people went to the airport, demanding flights out of Cabo San Lucas. The Mexican government began airlifting the first of thousands of stranded tourists, free of charge, to airports in Tijuana, Mazatlan, Guadalajara and Mexico City to catch connecting flights and, in the case of foreigners, receive consular assistance.

In November 2019, British Carrier TUI Airways, commenced flights to and from London's Gatwick Airport, thus being the first European carrier to fly in and out of the Los Cabos area. This flight was flown on a Boeing 787.

Architecture 
The architect of Los Cabos International Airport's 1997 renovation and expansion was Mexican architect and great-grandson of Queen Isabella II of Spain, Manuel De Santiago-de Borbón González Bravo. He was a member of ICOMOS (International Council on Monuments and Sites), and his lifetime architectural legacy to Mexico adds to  built nationwide, including famous buildings and national sites, as well as important national restorations like the Mexican Houses of Congress Palace (Palacio Legislativo de San Lázaro).

Terminals

The airport has two terminals. Terminal 1 operates domestic flights, and Terminal 2 operates international flights.

Airlines and destinations

Statistics

Passengers

Busiest routes 

Note

Facilities 
 The Trans-Peninsular Road has become a busy commercial and accommodation center which include the nearby establishments.

See also

 List of the busiest airports in Mexico

References

External links

 Los Cabos International Airport Official page GAP  at aeropuertosgap.com.mx (in English)
 Los Cabos Airport Terminal 1 Map
 Los Cabos Airport Terminal 2 Map

Airports in Baja California Sur
Los Cabos Municipality (Baja California Sur)
WAAS reference stations